Vurra–Arua–Koboko–Oraba Road is a road in the Northern Region of Uganda, connecting the town of Vurra at the International border with the Democratic Republic of the Congo with the city of Arua, the town of Koboko, and the town of Oraba at the International border with the Republic of South Sudan.

Location
The road connects the countries of DRC, Uganda and South Sudan. The coordinates of the road near Koboko are:3°24'54.0"N, 30°57'36.0"E (Latitude:3.4150; Longitude:30.9600).

Upgrading to bitumen
The government of Uganda earmarked this road for upgrading through the conversion of the existing gravel road to bitumen surface and the building of bridges and drainage channels. Bids for engineering consultants were announced on 16 November 2009. Construction was flagged off on Friday, 11 May 2012 by president Museveni. The construction tender was awarded to Chongqing International Construction Corporation (CICO), who were expected to carry out the works over a 36 months period, at a cost of UGX:132 billion (approx. US $52.8 million at that time), borrowed from the World Bank. Having failed to meet the construction deadline of 31 December 2014, the road remains unfinished as at July 2015.

See also
 Koboko District
 Maracha District
 Arua District
 Economy of Uganda
 UNRA
 List of roads in Uganda

References

External links
 Uganda National Road Authority Homepage
 Another Shs330 billion road project hit by scam claims

Roads in Uganda
Arua District
Maracha District
Koboko District
West Nile sub-region
Northern Region, Uganda